Zhou Yi may refer to:

 Zhou Yi (Jin Dynasty) (269–322), style name Boren, official of the Western and Eastern Jin dynasties
 Zhou Yi (musician), Shanghai born and New York-based Chinese pipa virtuoso
 Zhou Yi (softball) (born 1983), female Chinese softball player who competed at the 2004 Summer Olympics
 The I Ching, also known as Zhouyi, one of the oldest of the Chinese classic texts